Parentelopes albomaculatus is a species of beetle in the family Cerambycidae, and the only species in the genus Parentelopes. It was described by Pic in 1933.

References

Saperdini
Beetles described in 1933